Bojan Mijailović (born 28 August 1995) is a Serbian football defender, playing for Loznica.

Club career

Metalac Gornji Milanovac
Mijailović is a product of Metalac's youth school, and was a member of generation which made promotion to the best level Serbian youth league in 2014.
He made his debut for Metalac in 2012–13 season. Next season he made 1 league appearance too, but he was sitting on the bench several times. He also played 1 cup match against Partizan, and one play-off match for the Serbian SuperLiga, against Rad. Second match he started on the field, but complained of a headache from the tear gas that caused the match later was interrupted. After youth career, he left Metalac and joined local Zone league club Takovo, but he returned in his home club after six months and signed four-year contract at the beginning of 2015. He made his SuperLiga debut in the 7th fixture of 2015–16, against Spartak Subotica. In summer 2016, Mijailović moved on one-year loan to Serbian First League side Kolubara.

Career statistics

Club

References

External links
 Bojan Mijailović stats at utakmica.rs 
 

1995 births
Living people
People from Gornji Milanovac
Association football defenders
Serbian footballers
FK Metalac Gornji Milanovac players
FK Takovo players
FK Kolubara players
FK Javor Ivanjica players
FK Zlatibor Čajetina players
FK Loznica players
Serbian First League players
Serbian SuperLiga players